"Lock Up Your Daughters" is a song by the British rock band Slade, released in 1981 as the second single from the band's tenth studio album Till Deaf Do Us Part. It was written by lead vocalist Noddy Holder and bassist Jim Lea, and produced by Slade. It reached No. 29 in the UK, remaining in the charts for eight weeks.

Background
Following their revival after their performance at the 1980 Reading Festival, Slade regained success in the UK with their 1981 album We'll Bring the House Down and the Top 10 hit single of the same name. The band then began recording their next album Till Deaf Do Us Part. The first single, "Knuckle Sandwich Nancy", was released in May 1981 but failed to chart. In September, the band followed it up with "Lock Up Your Daughters" which was the band's first single to be released directly under their new label RCA. The single reached No. 29 in the UK, although the band felt sales suffered as their two appearances on Top of the Pops clashed with the showing of the blockbuster films Earthquake and Jaws on ITV.

"Lock Up Your Daughters" saw the band continuing to produce a more heavy metal-influenced sound as their performance at the Reading Festival attracted followers of the New wave of British heavy metal. In addition to the song's chart success, it also became a popular addition to the band's live concerts.

Release
"Lock Up Your Daughters" was released on 7" vinyl by RCA Records in the UK, Ireland, Germany, the Netherlands and Australia. It was the first Slade single to be released by RCA, although the label had handled distribution of the band's last few singles which had been released on the Cheapskate label. The B-Side, "Sign of the Times", originally appeared on the band's 1979 album Return to Base and was also released as a failed single from it.

Promotion
A music video was filmed to promote the single, although it received little airing at the time. It was filmed on 7 September 1981 at Portland Studios in London. In the UK, the band performed the song on the music show Top of the Pops, for broadcast on 24 September 1981. The band's performance was repeated on the 8 October edition of the show too. The band also performed the song on the Dutch AVRO TV show TopPop.
The music video was part screened on an episode of Tiswas, the video was overlaid with various messages from children in a gaudy greeny yellow colour. It did not see the light of day until 2005 when following the purchase of a video tape by Steve Knight from Mark Richards, David Graham from Slade In England created the documentary bootleg DVD 'One More Time' and included a cleaned up and re edited version that is still doing the rounds today.

Critical reception
Upon release, the single was reviewed on BBC Radio 1's Round Table show. It received a thumbs up from BBC presenter and radio DJ Mike Read, BBC radio presenter Dave Lee Travis and musician Eddy Grant. Mike Gardner of Record Mirror described the song as "raucous". In a review of Till Deaf Do Us Part, Kerrang! described the song as "traditional Slade". Melody Maker said the song was a "stomper in the well-loved traditions of Slade".

In a retrospective review of the album, Geoff Ginsberg of AllMusic commented on the song's catchiness, adding: ""Daughters" is a perfect example of how far the band had come. It retains the almost bubblegum sound of the earlier singles, while the heavy production style gives it a bit more of a hard-rocking edge." Joe Geesin of Get Ready to Rock! described the song as a "solid thumping rock song".

Track listing
7" Single
"Lock Up Your Daughters" - 3:31
"Sign of the Times" - 3:58

Chart performance

Cover versions
 In 1989, English-American rock band Lion recorded a version of the song for their second and final studio album Trouble in Angel City.

Personnel
Noddy Holder - lead vocals, guitar, producer
Dave Hill - lead guitar, backing vocals, producer
Jim Lea - bass, organ, backing vocals, producer
Don Powell - drums, producer

References

1981 singles
Slade songs
RCA Records singles
Songs written by Noddy Holder
Songs written by Jim Lea
1981 songs
Song recordings produced by Jim Lea
Song recordings produced by Noddy Holder
Song recordings produced by Dave Hill
Song recordings produced by Don Powell